Zack! Comedy nach Maß (English: Zack! Comedy Made) is a half-hour sketch-comedy series from Germany with Volker Michalowski in the lead role.

Action 
Comedian and actor Michalowski played a helpless klutz who constantly gets into problematic and complicated life situations from which he in a few words, slapstick broke free again and crazy actions. He slipped into each sketch in different roles. In total, he played since the first episode more than 100 different roles.

See also
List of German television series

External links
 

2005 German television series debuts
2008 German television series endings
German comedy television series
German-language television shows
Sat.1 original programming